Carrizosa is a municipality located in the province of Ciudad Real, in the autonomous community of Castilla-La Mancha, Spain.

History of the Region
Iron Age funerary vessels were found with painted horizontal stripes. Following the Battle of Alarcos, Muslims reconquered Castile again.
Year 1212. - The victory of Las Navas de Tolosa, leads the Order of Santiago to take over the Campo de Montiel, ending conquest in 1229 to seize the castle of Montiel.
Year 1215. - King Henry I of Castile, gives Carrizosa, among other places, the Count Don Alvaro Nunez de Lara, so that they are repopulated, specifying the assignment in another document dated 1217.
Year 1243. - The Order of Santiago and Alcaraz council clash over ownership of the Campo de Montiel castles, villages and wilds, Carrizosa amongst them.
Year 1387. - Is granted Carrizosa entrusted to Pedro Diaz de Monsalve, first known commander, who kept it until the year 1409. They follow a series of commanders until the parcel is the youngest son of Don Rodrigo Manrique, Enrique Manrique. The population at the time, would be about 90 habitanes. In these years, the castle is definitely abandoned and the population is settled in its current location, on the banks of the river Carrizosa (currently Canyamares).
Year 1493. - The finished building the parish church of Santa Catalina, which consisted of a nave of four arches of stone and covered with white pine and reed. On the west side was attached the cemetery.
Year 1515. - The population of Carrizosa, due to poor harvests and epidemics, has fallen to 45 inhabitants. In this year, the painter of Fuenllana, Hernando de Miranda, finished a beautiful altarpiece for the high altar of the parish. In November, visitors come to the Order of Santiago, making relationship of objects held by the church. Another visiting shrines and had Carrizosa is the Virgin of the Holm oak. These views are repeated in subsequent years, until the last visit of which no record, in 1554.
Year 1575. - Although Carrizosa remained Alhambra village had its own council and directs, he owned four homes in Villanueva de los Infantes. The year 1575 there are two maps made on the occasion of the Topographic Relations of Philip II.
Year 1590. - Carrizosa declares independence as Alhambra village after paying an amount of 578,000 maravedis. In the following year reached a population of 75 inhabitants.
In the following years of the seventeenth century, the commanders of the parcel leased land to people who were in charge of collecting tithes to the neighbors. There are several relationships heritage of the charge made in different years, that account for the possessions they had in the same town or area.
Year 1787. - In the Census of Floridablanca, consists Carrizosa as villa, with ordinary mayor belonging to the military order of Santiago. Its inhabitants were 349, of which 263 were listed as minor and profession. Highlights 38 laborers, 26 farmers and 14 servants.
Year 1811. - During the invasion of Napoleon, the French project a water transfer from the Azuer Ruidera gaps for White Houses, benefiting the mills and crops in the area. The situation in the country and the subsequent defeat of the French troops prevented its implementation.
Year 1900 - The census of that year gives a population of 1507 inhabitants.
Year 1920 - Appears smallpox epidemic, which for three years, producing high mortality.
Year 1925 - Around this year, mounting a power plant in the old mill dam.
Year 1928 - The new church is completed after being exhumed cemetery and demolish the old annex which had become too small.
Year 1931 - For a political conflict, a group of women destroys the power station and the town remains without power until the following year, in which it brings Ruidera.
Year 1932 - Present cemetery is constructed and closed the set in the place where today are the schools.
Year 1960 - Carrizosa largest census reached its history : 3026 inhabitants
Year 2012 - Óscar Parra de Carrizosa Hold wheel in the town, which will be the last film of actress Sara Montiel. The film features Javier Gurruchaga, Maria Garralón, Arevalo and Beatriz Rico, among others.
The screenwriter and film director from Madrid, carrizoseño origin, Oscar Parra de Carrizosa, published in 1992 a book with the history of the town, ranging from the year 720 AD our days. Available in the National Library of Madrid.

Myths, Legends and Traditions

Festive and culinary traditions
San Anton Carrizosa exist and existed in many traditions associated with the celebration of the feast of this saint on January 17. Formerly, until about 60 years, men on horseback roamed the streets of the town, competing to collect cakes for San Anton being thrown from balconies and windows. The cake had a similar development of San Blas rolls that comment later.
Another tradition associated with the saint was the fifth. Named for the old system of military service by redeeming one in five, fifth. Posibiblemente also related to some ancient form of protest, tore the curtains fifths of the doors of the houses in the nights leading up to January 17. The night of 16 January 17 fires were lit in the streets but most of it was the main square of wood which was collected by the fifth. Around the fires ate, drank and danced dances to the sound of the old songs also related to this event.
Another even older tradition and unused for more than half a century was to release a pig (animal traditionally linked to the saint  by the town's streets fed by all the neighbors. Hence there Carrizosa expression "be like the guttural of San Antón" in reference to street life of it.
Rolls of San Blas and St. Agatha. It is celebrated since ancient saints days 3 and 5 February. Loaves consist of small irregularly shaped oval tending to be made with flour, water, oil, salt and aniseed (aniseed) without yeast so the result is a crispy bread. The tradition that once marked should be baked the day before Mass to be blessed saints. It is usually done by religious promise or request for favor agredecimiento the saints (related to diseases of the throat or voice in the case of San Blas or illnesses related to the chest of St. Agatha). Families that are written by the children shared that early morning, tour the houses where the deals.
Tostones. Like the previous case, is a culinary tradition. The croutons are a type of nougat made family so the night of 31 October. Is performed based on molten sugar mixed with almonds and walnuts. Peanuts may also be added. Mixed caramelized sugar and nuts expands on a flat surface and the aid of a mallet or mass expands bottle until a uniform cake. It's called "make croutons" to the design of the meeting fresh and festive family or friends on the occasion of the night of October 31
Feast Festival Matins of family and friends celebrated the morning of December 25. Traditionally it was made after midnight mass after the breakdown of the prohibition of eating meat that existed on 24 December.

Monuments and Natural Places

Church of Santa Catalina 
It has some impressive frescoes on the ceiling and altar which depicts the ascension to heaven of Santa Catalina. On the roof, include representations of the four evangelists accompanied by their symbolic animals as the visions of the prophet Ezekiel. Also of extraordinary quality the rest of the frescoes depicting the Last Supper or Jesus as a shepherd. They were painted by Jesus Velasco in 1942.
Source of Mina. Power and water supply pylon old public and animal watering. Its construction and date are unknown. Besides source and trough, was also used to irrigate the gardens antigüemente located below it in places now occupied by the slaughterhouse and other private estates. The monument has undergone several restoration and disastrous attempts that caused the loss of the original stones and the original physiognomy cement and stones using different type. Its name, La Mina, can come cimbrático system that collects water and carries it to the source since there is a well known formwork system when used to collect the waters that flow to the foot of a mountain, as is the case.
House of the commanders in the Plaza Mayor.
Route of the "Via Crucis". 14 crosses dotted the streets and maintained and decorated by the neighbors. Perfect trip to tour the oldest streets of the village and enjoy the views from the higher streets.

Hermitage Virgen del Salido
Located at the foot of the hill Castellon where the ruins of the Moorish castle of Carrizosa Peñaflor. It is situated on the banks of the estate of Jaraba. In architecture, rebuilt after the Civil War in 1968, as shown in the map of the Party of Campo de Montiel, 1765.
Shrine of Our Lady of the Holm oak. Located just 1.5 miles from Carrizosa was one of the ancient hermitages Carrizosa had Guestbooks according to the visitors of the Order of Santiago. Currently, the cult belongs to the neighboring town of Villahermosa although over the centuries has remained a huge devotion to this ancient Carrizosa black virgin.
Archaeological remains of the Moorish castle of Peñaflor (next to the Shrine Virgen del Salido).
House work and the Fuenlabrada farm, formerly owned Conde de Leyva and later by her four daughters " the ladies of Fuenlabrada.
Palace of the Dukes of San Fernando de Sevilla

Landscapes

Huelma Caves
Next is the old farm and mill work Huelma
Stream of the Toriles. Waterfall visible only in rainy years. Primitive landscape with caves, boulders and waterfalls and fountains that appear everywhere.
Alameda Azuer River (river Salido)
Ruins of the House of Oydor and environments. Ruins of old farmhouse which appeared on maps of the Party of Campo de Montiel, 1765 and later. It is located on the old road to La Solana before the intercession Alhambra Road.
Roads and places of the estate of Fuenlabrada.

Parties

San Anton : January 17. It is traditional bonfires in the streets of the town
The May : April 30, in honor of the Virgen del Salido.
May Crosses : 2,3 and 4 May.
San Isidro : May 15.
Celebrations in Honor of Our Lady of Salido : They are celebrated between 13 and 16 August.
Pilgrimage of the Virgin in the Chapel of the Departed : the last weekend of August.
Hearts of Jesus
The traditional festivals most popular attachment Carrizosa the Cross of May party in honor of the Virgen del Salido.

Cross the May

The feast of you the Cross of May is held between April 30, 2, 3 and 4 May. During the evening a young Rondalla march through the village singing the Ladies Mays. On day 2 he sings to the Crosses (altars placed in the houses) and are held treats. Its origin is pagan feast of excitement as spring and has variations across the Spanish geography. In our region have been held in many localities, but where they remain with all their traditional Carrizosa is.
At Christianized, these parties became an exaltation of the Cross as a symbol of the Passion of Jesus. Basically they consist, in its most traditional, in the ornamentation of a cross -based floral and plant elements (reminiscent of its ancient meaning), along with symbols of the Passion (the nails, the crown of thorns, etc.).
May this celebration really begins on the evening of April 30 and continues through the early morning of May 1, during which, gangs of young men (and now also wenches) dedicated their songs to the beloved women (wives, girlfriends, family) in what is called "ladies night". It starts with a traditional song called "in May", in which, through its various stanzas (the first of which is to apply for leave of the lady), they will "draw" the perfections of a woman's body:
Noted for their interest altars of Corpus Christi, whose feast is celebrated in June.

Castile (historical region)